The American Society for the Judicial Settlement of International Disputes was organized in Baltimore on the 6 February 1910, at the residence of Theodore Marburg. The organization aimed for not only the creation of a permanent tribunal for the judicial settlement of international conflicts, but also wanted to create the sentiment that the international controversies should be resolved by a permanent international court. The Society was the forerunner of the League to Enforce Peace, which developed into the League of Nations concept and ultimately into the United Nations.

The Society planned to establish a permanent tribunal at The Hague.

William Howard Taft was its first president. Theodore Marburg was its president from 1913 to 1916.

References

Arbitration organizations